Thomas Updegraff (April 3, 1834 – October 4, 1910) was an American attorney, politician, and five-term Republican member of the U.S. House of Representatives from northeastern Iowa. His two periods of service were separated by ten years out of Congress.

Early life

Updegraff, a descendant of the Dutch Op den Graeff family, was born in Tioga County, Pennsylvania. He attended the University of Notre Dame, then moved to Iowa.

He was the clerk of the district court of Clayton County, Iowa, from 1856 to 1860. After studying law, he was admitted to the bar in 1860 and commenced practice in McGregor, Iowa.

Political career
In 1878 he began to serve as a member of the Iowa House of Representatives. In November of the same year, he was elected as a Republican to the United States House of Representatives from Iowa's 3rd congressional district, which was then made up of the seven counties in Iowa's northeastern corner. Two years later he was re-elected to a second term. The following year the Iowa General Assembly reapportioned the congressional districts to accommodate the addition of two additional seats, placing Updegraff's home county in a reconfigured 4th congressional district.  He won the Republican Party's nomination in 1882. However, in the general election he was defeated by Luman Hamlin Weller of the United States Greenback Party. Updegraff had served Iowa's 3rd congressional district from March 4, 1879 to March 3, 1883.

Returning to Iowa, Updegraff was a member of the McGregor Board of Education, and the city solicitor. He was a delegate to the 1888 Republican National Convention.

In 1892, he again ran for Congress in Iowa's 4th district, winning not only the Republican nomination but also the general election (where he defeated incumbent Democrat Walter Halben Butler). He was re-elected to two more terms. However, in 1898, he was defeated in his bid for the Republican nomination by Gilbert N. Haugen, who would go on to serve seventeen consecutive terms. In all, Updegraff served the 4th congressional district from March 4, 1893 to March 3, 1899.

After Congress
Updegraff then returned to McGregor to resume the practice of law. He died in McGregor, and was interred there in Pleasant Grove Cemetery.

Family
In 1858, Updegraff married Laura A. Platt of Huron County, Ohio. She died in 1865, and he later married Florence Haight.  They were the parents of two daughters, Elizabeth and Rachel.

References

External links

1834 births
1910 deaths
People from Tioga County, Pennsylvania
People from McGregor, Iowa
University of Notre Dame alumni
Iowa lawyers
School board members in Iowa
Republican Party members of the Iowa House of Representatives
Republican Party members of the United States House of Representatives from Iowa
19th-century American politicians
19th-century American lawyers